The 1998 Tirreno–Adriatico was the 33rd edition of the Tirreno–Adriatico cycle race and was held from 11 March to 18 March 1998. The race started in Sorrento and finished in San Benedetto del Tronto. The race was won by Rolf Järmann of the Casino team.

General classification

References

1998
1998 in Italian sport